Oga Bolaji is a 2018 Nigerian drama film written and directed by Kayode Kasum. The film stars Ikponmwosa Gold, Omowumi Dada and Idowu Philips in the lead roles. The film was released on 7 August 2018 and received positive reviews from critics and was critically acclaimed for its screenplay and story. The film was also screened at several film festivals such as New York African Film Festival, Nollywood week Paris, Zimbabwe International Film Festival, RTF Film Festival, Cardiff Film Festival and Zanzibar International Festival. The film was premiered for free by the director himself via YouTube in April 2020 for the people who were staying at home during lockdown due to the coronavirus pandemic in the country.

Synopsis 
Oga Bolaji, a happy-go-lucky life of a retired, 40-year-old musician whose life changes drastically forever when he crosses paths with a 7-year-old girl.

Cast 
 Ikponmwosa Gold as Oga Bolaji
 Idowu Philips as Mama Bolaji
 Omowumi Dada as Victoria
 Gregory Ojefua as Omo
 Jasmine Fakunle as Ajua
 Ronke Ojo
Officer Woos

Awards and nominations

References

External links 
 

2018 films
Nigerian drama films
2010s English-language films
English-language Nigerian films
Afrikaans-language films
Yoruba-language films
Films shot in Nigeria
2018 drama films